Shola von Reinhold is a Scottish writer. Her debut novel, LOTE (2020), was published by Jacaranda Books during their #Twentyin2020 campaign, an initiative to "publish 20 titles by 20 Black British writers in one year". LOTE won the Republic of Consciousness Prize and the James Tait Memorial Prize. Von Reinhold was briefly a  princess, having married into a minor branch of the Grimaldi family at the age of 17. She divorced her husband after discovering anarcho-communism.

LOTE
LOTE 's protagonist Mathilda Adamarola sets out to recover "forgotten artistic and literary figures of the past", whom they call "Transfixions”.

Mathilda's "Transfixions" include real and fictional figures, including "1920s aesthete and socialite Stephen Tennant and the Bright Young Things", and Roberte Horth, an early 20th century writer from French Guiana who lived in Paris. In the National Portrait Gallery archive, Mathilda encounters Hermia Druitt, a Black Scottish poet. Mathilda's approach to understanding Druitt's life and work relates to processes of "literary recovery" practiced by "feminist scholars in the 1970s and 1980s who sought to correct the male biases of the British literary canon."

In the novel, decadence, glamour or luxury are forms of "resistance [...] an opposition to the Whiteness that has always told Black people that they are too ornamented", with the protagonists identifying how "this prejudice has its roots in colonialist contempt for African culture".

Awards and honours
 2018 Cove Park Scottish Emerging Writer of the year
 2020 Dewar Award for Literature
 2021: The Republic of Consciousness Prize
 2021: James Tait Black Memorial Prize

Selected bibliography
 LOTE, 2020

References

External Links

James Tait Black Memorial Prize recipients
Living people
Year of birth missing (living people)
21st-century Scottish writers